"Favorite Song" is a song by American rapper Chance the Rapper from his second mixtape Acid Rap (2013). It features American rapper Childish Gambino and was produced by Chance himself and Nate Fox.

Composition
The song contains a sample of "Clean Up Woman" by Betty Wright, described as "tropical guitar samples". Fred Thomas of AllMusic described the instrumental as "happily melodic".

The second verse of the song uses a staccato rhythm and internal rhyme scheme that is also used in the song "I Am the Very Model of a Modern Major-General" from Gilbert and Sullivan's 1879 opera The Pirates of Penzance and the poem Song of Eärendil from The Lord of the Rings series. This was noted by Stephen Colbert in a video of Rolling Stone's "Song Breakdown" series.

Critical reception
In a review of Acid Rap, Maya Kalev of Fact praised the humor in the song, also describing Chance the Rapper as "good to a fault, putting his guests to shame" and that "Childish Gambino brings exactly nothing to the table".

Charts

References

2013 songs
Chance the Rapper songs
Donald Glover songs
Songs written by Chance the Rapper
Songs written by Donald Glover
Songs written by Willie Clarke (songwriter)
Songs written by Blowfly (musician)